Ethan van Leeuwen (born 8 April 2001) is a badminton player from England.

Career
In 2021, he became the national champion of England after winning the men's doubles, with Matthew Clare at the 2021 English National Badminton Championships.

Achievements

BWF International Challenge/Series (2 runners-up) 
Men's doubles

Mixed doubles

 BWF International Challenge tournament
 BWF International Series tournament
 BWF Future Series tournament

References

English male badminton players
Living people
2001 births